National Highway 516A, commonly referred to as NH 516A is a national highway in India. It is a spur road of National Highway 16.  NH-516A traverses the state of Odisha in India.

Route 
NH 516A connects Gopalpur port, with Satpada.

Junctions  
 
  Terminal near Gopalpur Port.
  Terminal near Satpada.

See also 
 List of National Highways in India
 List of National Highways in India by state

References

External links 

 NH 516A on OpenStreetMap

National highways in India
National Highways in Odisha